The 2017 Independence Bowl was a college football bowl game played on December 27, 2017, at Independence Stadium in Shreveport, Louisiana.  The 42nd annual Independence Bowl featured the Southern Miss Golden Eagles of Conference USA against the Florida State Seminoles of the Atlantic Coast Conference. Sponsored by Walk-On's Bistreaux & Bar, the game was officially known as the Walk-On's Independence Bowl.

The contest was televised on ESPN, with kickoff at 1:30 PM (EST). It was one of the 2017–18 bowl games concluding the 2017 FBS football season. Florida State defeated Southern Miss, .

Team selection
The game featured the Southern Miss Golden Eagles against the Florida State Seminoles.

This was the twenty-third meeting between the schools, with Florida State holding a 13–8–1 advantage.  They had most recently played in 1996, when the Seminoles defeated the Golden Eagles by a score of 54–14.

Southern Miss

Florida State

On December 21, 2017, an unofficial report was published on Reddit claiming that the Seminoles were not bowl eligible due to an NCAA rule stating that for an FCS opponent to be countable towards bowl eligibility, the FCS program must have awarded 90% of the FCS scholarship limit. Delaware State, an FCS team that lost to FSU earlier in the season, did not meet the 90% threshold set by the NCAA. Without this win, FSU stood at 5–6 on the season. However, on December 22, 2017, Florida State addressed the issue and stated that Delaware State verified its scholarship situation as eclipsing the 90-percent threshold. This, FSU claims, is due to an alleged established NCAA rule interpretation, allowing academic and other non-athletic scholarships to count towards the required threshold, however they did not reference the interpreted rule. The confirmation officially gave Florida State bowl eligibility, and allowed the team to play in the Independence Bowl.

Game summary

Scoring summary

Statistics

References

2017–18 NCAA football bowl games
2017
2017
2017
2017 in sports in Louisiana
December 2017 sports events in the United States